Mullin v Richards [1998] 1 All ER 920 is a judgment of the Court of Appeal of England and Wales, dealing with liability of children under English law of negligence. The question in the case was what standard of behaviour could be expected of a child.

Facts
The plaintiff and the defendant, two female friends of fifteen years old, were fencing with plastic rulers in their classroom. One of the rulers shattered and a piece of plastic flew into the plaintiff girl's eye, partially depriving her of sight.

Judgment
The Court of Appeal found that the standard to be expected of a 15-year-old child was not the standard of a reasonable person, but that of a reasonable and "ordinarily prudent" 15-year-old. It was held that an ordinary prudent 15-year old could not have foreseen any injury when playing with rulers and the defendant was therefore found not liable in negligence.

See also
Standard of care in English law
Breach of duty in English law
Blyth v Birmingham Waterworks
Bolam v Friern Hospital Management Committee
Wilsher v Essex Area Health Authority
Wells v Cooper

Notes

English tort case law
1998 in case law
1998 in British law
Court of Appeal (England and Wales) cases